Daniel Welser (born February 16, 1983 in Klagenfurt am Wörthersee, Austria) is an Austrian professional ice hockey player who is currently with the EC Red Bull Salzburg of the Austrian Hockey League (EBEL). He participated at the 2011 IIHF World Championship as a member of the Austria men's national ice hockey team.

Career statistics

Regular season and playoffs

International

References

External links

1983 births
Living people
Austrian ice hockey forwards
EC Red Bull Salzburg players
EC KAC players
Sportspeople from Klagenfurt
Skellefteå AIK players
Ice hockey players at the 2014 Winter Olympics
Olympic ice hockey players of Austria